Mateus Müller de Souza Lopes (born November 11, 1995 in Jataí), commonly known as Mateus Müller, is a Brazilian footballer.

Honours

Paysandu
Copa Verde: 2018

References

External links
 Mateus Müller at playmakerstats.com (English version of ogol.com.br and zerozero.pt)

1995 births
Living people
Brazilian footballers
Brazilian expatriate footballers
Sociedade Esportiva Palmeiras players
Clube do Remo players
Esporte Clube São Bento players
Clube Náutico Capibaribe players
Vila Nova Futebol Clube players
G.D. Estoril Praia players
Paysandu Sport Club players
River Atlético Clube players
Campeonato Brasileiro Série B players
Campeonato Brasileiro Série C players
Campeonato Brasileiro Série D players
Association football fullbacks
Brazilian expatriate sportspeople in Portugal
Expatriate footballers in Portugal
Sportspeople from Goiás